Cottocomephorus is a genus of freshwater ray-finned fishes belonging to the family Cottidae, the typical sculpins. This genus is endemic to Lake Baikal and its surrounding tributaries in Russia. They are an important food for the Baikal seal, during the winter second only to the golomyankas.

Taxonomy
Cottocomephorus Was first proposed as a monospecific genus in 1900 by the French ichthyologist Jacques Pellegrin when he described Cottocomephorus megalops as a new species. The genus was classified in the family Cottocomephoridae, however, the 5th edition of Fishes of the World classifies the genus within the subfamily Cottinae of the family Cottidae, studies having found that the genera formerly included in the Cottocomephoridae were a clade arising from the genus Cottus.

Species
There are currently three recognized species in this genus:
 Cottocomephorus alexandrae Taliev, 1935
 Cottocomephorus grewingkii (Dybowski, 1874) (Baikal yellowfin)
 Cottocomephorus inermis (Yakovlev, 1890) (Longfin Baikal sculpin)

References

Cottinae
 
Taxa named by Jacques Pellegrin
Scorpaeniformes genera
Fish of Lake Baikal